Quecksilber ("quicksilver") is the second studio album by German rock band Stahlmann, released in 2012.

The album reached number 39 on the Official German Charts in February 2012.

Track listing

References 

2012 albums
Stahlmann albums